The Browder fixed-point theorem is a refinement of the Banach fixed-point theorem for uniformly convex Banach spaces.

History
(An asymptotic center of a sequence , if it exists, is a limit of the Chebyshev centers   for truncated sequences .) A stronger property than asymptotic center is Delta-limit of Teck-Cheong Lim, which in the uniformly convex space coincides with the weak limit if the space has the Opial property.

See also
 Fixed-point theorems
 Banach fixed-point theorem

References
 Felix E. Browder, Nonexpansive nonlinear operators in a Banach space. Proc. Natl. Acad. Sci. U.S.A. 54 (1965) 1041–1044
 William A. Kirk, A fixed point theorem for mappings which do not increase distances, Amer. Math. Monthly 72 (1965) 1004–1006. 
 Michael Edelstein, The construction of an asymptotic center with a fixed-point property, Bull. Amer. Math. Soc. 78 (1972), 206-208.

Fixed-point theorems